Tony Tulathimutte (born September 1, 1983) is an American fiction writer. His short story "Scenes from the Life of the Only Girl in Water Shield, Alaska" received an O. Henry Award in 2008. In 2016, he published his debut novel Private Citizens, which was called "the first great Millennial novel" by New York Magazine. Tulathimutte has bachelor's and master's degrees in Symbolic Systems from Stanford University.

Raised in South Hadley, Massachusetts, he is a graduate of the Iowa Writers' Workshop, and formerly worked as a writer and researcher on user experience topics. Currently he is the lead instructor at CRIT, a creative writing workshop based in Brooklyn, NY.

Works
Fiction
 “Composite Body” in Cimarron Review
 "Inheritance" in Threepenny Review
 "Brains", novella in Malahat Review
 "The Man Who Wasn't Male" in Wag's Revue
 "Scenes from the Life of the Only Girl in Water Shield, Alaska" (corrected text) in Threepenny Review
 "Saint Pantaleone" in "Selected Shorts: Too Hot for Radio"
 "The Feminist" in n+1

Nonfiction
 Remote Research, co-author with Nate Bolt

Awards
Whiting Award in Fiction, 2017
 O. Henry Award, 2008
 First Place, Bocock-Guerard Fiction Prize, 2004

References

External links
 Official website

Writers from California
Stanford University alumni
Living people
1983 births
American fiction writers
Writers from Springfield, Massachusetts